The Radioactive Tour was the second concert tour by British singer Rita Ora, in support of her debut studio album, Ora (2012). The tour began on 28 January 2013, in Manchester, England, and concluded on 31 August 2013. The fashion label, Pucci, created Ora's tour wardrobe.

Opening acts
Iggy Azalea 
DJ Fresh 
Zowie 
Ruby Frost

Tour dates

Notes

Festivals and other miscellaneous performances

Future Music Sideshow
Future Music Festival
Good Life Festival
Future Music Festival Asia
Radio 1's Big Weekend
As One in the Park
Chime for Change
Party in the Paddock
Parklife Weekender
North East Live
Isle of MTV
Glastonbury Festival
Wireless Festival
T in the Park
Global Gathering
South Island Festival
Oxegen
Lytham Proms Festival
V Festival
Sundown Festival

Cancellations and rescheduled shows

References 

Rita Ora concert tours
2013 concert tours